Chang Che-ping (born December 1958) is a Taiwanese military officer

Career
Chang was born in Taoyuan, Taiwan. His parents move to Taiwan from Mainland China. His ancestral home from Lingling, Hunan. He completed his studies at the Republic of China Air Force Academy in 1982, later graduating from National Defense University in 1993. He led the 499th Tactical Fighter Wing in Hsinchu, and was appointed to lead the Air Force Combatant Command in 2015. Chang subsequently served as deputy commander of the Republic of China Air Force until his promotion to commander of the air force took effect on 1 March 2018. On 1 July 2019, Chang succeeded Shen Yi-ming as vice minister of defense, and was placed in charge of policy. Chang left his vice ministerial position to replace Wang Shin-lung as president of National Defense University on 1 July 2021.

Espionage probe
On 28 July 2021, Mirror Media reported that Taiwanese prosecutors were investigating Chang over his contact with a Chinese spy ring. The probe continued into August without Chang being formally named a suspect. He was later renamed as a witness. In 2022, Taipei District Prosecutors Office charged retired major general Chien and retired lieutenant colonel Wei for developing a spy network for China, accusing the duo of unsuccessfully trying to recruit Chang.

References

1958 births
Living people
Presidents of universities and colleges in Taiwan
National Defense University (Republic of China) alumni
Republic of China Air Force personnel
Government ministers of Taiwan